Odonthalitus lacticus is a species of moth of the family Tortricidae. It is found in Mexico in the states of Durango and Sinaloa.

The length of the forewings is 6.5 mm for males and 6–7 mm for females. The forewings are cream with a dark brown basal area. The hindwings are pale grey brown.

References

Moths described in 1991
Euliini
Moths of Central America
Taxa named by Józef Razowski